Anne-Yvonne Le Dain (born 1 September 1955) is a French politician. She was the Socialist Member of Parliament for Hérault's 2nd constituency from 2012 to 2017.

Early life 
Le Dain was born in Versailles.

Career 
She was elected to parliament in the 2012 French legislative election.

In the 2017 election, she came in seventh place in her own constituency on the first-round. Her seat was eventually won by Muriel Ressiguier from La France Insoumise.

In 2020, she joined the new political party; Territories of Progress.

References

See also 

 List of deputies of the 14th National Assembly of France

1955 births
Living people
People from Hérault
Deputies of the 14th National Assembly of the French Fifth Republic
21st-century French politicians
21st-century French women politicians
Women members of the National Assembly (France)
Socialist Party (France) politicians

People from Versailles